Miles Taylor (born 1986/1987) is an American government official who served in the administrations of George W. Bush and Donald Trump. In the administration of the latter, he was an appointee who served in the United States Department of Homeland Security (DHS) from 2017 to 2019, including as chief of staff of the DHS. He was first recruited into the department by former DHS Secretary and White House Chief of Staff John F. Kelly, serving as his senior advisor.

Taylor wrote The New York Times op-ed in 2018 under the pen-name "Anonymous" that was entitled, "I Am Part of the Resistance Inside the Trump Administration" that drew widespread attention for its criticism of Trump. In September 2019, he left the administration and went to work for Google. In November 2019, again under the pen name "Anonymous" he published a book entitled, A Warning. In October 2020, he revealed that he was "Anonymous" while campaigning against Trump's reelection.

In August 2020, Taylor produced an advertisement for Republican Voters Against Trump, denouncing Trump and endorsing Joe Biden in the 2020 United States presidential election. He was the first former Trump administration official to endorse Biden. He later co-founded the Renew America Movement, alongside former Republican governors, members of Congress, and cabinet officials, with the objective to break Trump's hold on the Republican Party. In May 2022 he announced that he was leaving the Republican Party, and two months later, he co-founded the Forward Party with former New Jersey Governor Christie Todd Whitman, former Democratic presidential candidate Andrew Yang, and former GOP Congressman David Jolly.

Early life and education 
Taylor grew up in La Porte, Indiana, where he was an Indiana state debate champion, and one of the valedictorians of his class at La Porte High School in 2006. While in high school, he served as a page in the U.S. House of Representatives in Washington, D.C. He received a bachelor of arts degree in international security studies from Indiana University Bloomington, which he attended as a Harry S. Truman Scholar and Herman B. Wells Scholar. As a senior, he received IU's inaugural Presidential Student Internship  and was a recipient of the Elvis J. Stahr Award awarded to the university's top few graduating seniors.

Taylor received an MPhil in International Relations from New College, Oxford, which he attended as a 2012 Marshall Scholar.

Career 
Taylor's decision to have a career in government was largely motivated by the September 11 attacks in 2001. He later said that he "wanted to focus my entire professional life on making sure a day like that wouldn't happen again, and dedicating my career to, what I thought, was the mission of this country, and that's the advancement of human freedom."

In 2007, while in college, Taylor interned in the office of the Secretary of Defense and the office of Vice President Dick Cheney. In 2008, he worked as the briefing book coordinator at the Department of Homeland Security for Secretary Michael Chertoff and Deputy Secretary Paul A. Schneider. In 2009, he served as a regional policy intern for the Defense Department.

Taylor was a political appointee in the administration of George W. Bush. He was a staffer for the House Appropriations Committee and then the Committee on Homeland Security, where he served on Chairman Michael McCaul's staff. Taylor was McCaul's chief speechwriter and national security advisor on counterterrorism and foreign policy. He also served as the majority staff lead for the congressional Task Force on Combating Terrorist and Foreign Fighter Travel. In 2015, he was named a Penn Kemble Fellow by the National Endowment for Democracy.

Department of Homeland Security 

Taylor joined the Department of Homeland Security (DHS) in February 2017, when John Kelly, later White House Chief of Staff, was Secretary of Homeland Security. Taylor served as DHS deputy chief of staff and senior advisor to Kelly. He later served as chief of staff of DHS toward the end of the tenure of Secretary Kirstjen Nielsen and the beginning of Acting Secretary Kevin McAleenan. Taylor described a version of the Trump administration's travel restrictions as "tough" but "tailored". He reportedly clashed with other officials to try to limit the number of countries affected by it. He was also involved in debates regarding Trump administration immigration policies. He later described the Trump administration family separation policy as a "sickening display of bad judgment". Taylor cited the "train wreck" policy as one of his reasons for quitting the Trump Administration in protest, calling it "one of the most disheartening and disgusting things I've ever experienced in public service."

"Anonymous" 
Taylor authored a September 2018 The New York Times op-ed entitled, "I Am Part of the Resistance Inside the Trump Administration" under the name "Anonymous". He said that, in April 2019, he had personally witnessed President Trump offer Homeland Security staff federal pardons for any criminal prosecution arising from their actions in stopping illegal immigration to the United States, and it was at that point that Taylor decided to resign from the department. He left DHS in June 2019, and anonymously released a follow-up book entitled, A Warning (November 2019), which included an account of the instability inside the Trump White House and administration. USA Today called the book "a scathing portrait of a president and administration in chaos," and The Washington Post wrote that the book had "no modern historical parallel for a firsthand account of a sitting president written in book form by an anonymous author". It reached number one on The New York Times Best Seller list.

Taylor initially denied being "Anonymous" in a number of interviews. After he acknowledged that he was "Anonymous", he said he owed a mea culpa to those journalists, but noted that, as "Anonymous", he always had said that he "would ultimately come out under my own name". In an online discussion after the release of A Warning, he had answered questions anonymously and said he would reveal his identity in the coming months before the 2020 election. He also pledged to donate the bulk of the proceeds from the book to nonprofit organizations such as the White House Correspondents' Association. Of his decision not to reveal his identity, Taylor said in October 2020:  "Issuing my critiques without attribution forced the President to answer them directly on their merits or not at all, rather than creating distractions through petty insults and name-calling. I wanted the attention to be on the arguments themselves."

Google 
In September 2019, Taylor was hired by Google as a government affairs and public policy manager with a title of head of national security policy engagement. He was later promoted to lead Google's advanced technology and security strategy. Around the same time, he also became a senior fellow at the Auburn University McCrary Center for Cyber and Critical Infrastructure Security and a member of the Council on Foreign Relations.

Public opposition to the Trump administration 
In August 2020, Taylor took a leave of absence from Google to support Joe Biden's presidential campaign. He made an advertisement for Republican Voters Against Trump, denouncing Trump and endorsing Biden in the 2020 presidential election. That same month, Taylor also wrote an opinion piece for The Washington Post. Columnist Jennifer Rubin said the op-ed added "detail to what we could have only surmised was the story behind chaotic policy rollouts" and that the advertisement he released "may be the most compelling of the 2020 election cycle". The next day, Taylor appeared on multiple news and analysis shows saying that other former members of the Trump administration were considering speaking out similarly. On August 24, Taylor confirmed to NBC News that he was co-founding, with two other unnamed Republican officials, the Republican Political Alliance for Integrity and Reform (REPAIR), a group that aimed to oppose reelection of Trump and to reform the Republican Party after the 2020 election.

Journalist Judy Woodruff asked Taylor in a PBS NewsHour interview why he had spoken out when he did rather than immediately after leaving the administration. Taylor responded,

Taylor's attacks against Trump were extensive. Among other anecdotes, he revealed that Trump was too distracted to pay attention to intelligence briefings, that Trump refused internal recommendations to punish Moscow for interference in U.S. affairs, and that Trump wanted to "swap" Puerto Rico for Greenland because it was "dirty and the people were poor". Taylor also said that Trump tried to block emergency aid for California wildfire victims because it was a Democratic state, and that Trump told his homeland security secretary to take marching orders from cable talk-show host Lou Dobbs.

In 2020, Taylor, along with over 130 other former Republican national security officials, signed a statement that asserted that President Trump was unfit to serve another term, and "To that end, we are firmly convinced that it is in the best interest of our nation that Vice President Joe Biden be elected as the next President of the United States, and we will vote for him."

In September 2020, Taylor revealed to The Lincoln Project that, before he resigned from the DHS, a senior presidential adviser told him about a list of executive orders that has been prepared in case President Trump would win a second term, which Taylor alleged were orders deemed unacceptable during a first term presidency because they could harm the president's chances of reelection. Later, BuzzFeed reporter Hamed Aleaziz concluded that Taylor was implying Stephen Miller was that senior presidential adviser, with The Guardian reiterating this claim and reporting that Miller's biographer Jean Guerrero warned about a "wishlist" of his relating to immigration policy under a Trump second term.

Taylor also told news organizations that Trump ordered officials to have American flags raised back up when they were lowered in honor of Senator John McCain, and that Trump deliberately ignored warnings about the rise of domestic terrorism for political reasons. Taylor was also among those who appeared on a special that aired on CNN in October 2020, entitled, "The Insiders: A Warning from Former Trump Officials". During the special, Taylor criticized Trump's singular focus on immigration, especially the border wall, saying that his "wall-or-nothing approach to governing meant the president ignored some of the most critical homeland security threats to our country, cybersecurity challenges, counterterrorism, manmade and natural disasters, and foreign interference in our democracy."

In June 2021, Taylor tweeted that he would run in the 2024 United States presidential election as an independent if Trump were to win the Republican nomination. The plan is to split the conservative vote in order to deny Trump a victory, although he later indicated on Twitter that he was not seriously considering being the candidate. In an interview with MSNBC the same month, Taylor stated that "the number one national security threat I've ever seen in my life to this country's democracy is the party that I'm in — the Republican Party. It is the number one national security threat to the United States of America," ranking his party above "ISIS, al-Qaeda, and Russia". He also stated that if House Minority Leader Kevin McCarthy (a Republican) became Speaker, it would represent "Trump's hand on that Speaker's gavel."

Renew America Movement 
Taylor became a regular CNN contributor in August 2020. Following Trump's loss to Biden, Taylor stepped down from his role at Google, but continued appearing on CNN while working on other projects.

In the wake of the May 2021 decision by House Republicans to remove Representative Liz Cheney as conference chair because of her opposition to Trump, Taylor and Evan McMullin organized a group of more than 150 Republicans—including former governors, senators, congressmen, cabinet secretaries, and party leaders—to issue "A Call for American Renewal" threatening to form a third party if the Republican Party did not reform itself.

In June 2021, Taylor and McMullin launched a new organization, the Renew America Movement (RAM). The organization's stated goal is to recruit candidates in the 2022 elections to challenge candidates who continue to support Trump. In October 2021, Taylor and former New Jersey Governor Christine Todd Whitman published an opinion piece in The New York Times announcing that RAM would be supporting "rational" Republicans and moderate Democrats in the 2022 midterm elections, with the goal of steering power away from members of the GOP who are pro-Trump. Taylor's group subsequently released a statement that they planned to raise "tens of millions" of dollars to defend a designated slate of House and Senate candidates in order to counter Donald Trump's hold on the Republican Party.

The Forward Party 
In July 2022, Taylor merged his organization -- Renew America Movement—with several others to launch a new political party in the United States, alongside former nationally known Democrats, Independents, and Republicans. In announcing the new Forward Party, Taylor told Reuters: "The fundamentals have changed. When other third party movements have emerged in the past it’s largely been inside a system where the American people aren’t asking for an alternative. The difference here is we are seeing an historic number of Americans saying they want one." Taylor

Havana syndrome incidents 
In a 60 Minutes interview in February 2022, Taylor recounted that he had two experiences that matched the Havana syndrome symptoms. Taylor also indicated that he was aware of a cabinet-level official who had similar episodes.

Political affiliations 
Although Taylor was a lifelong member of the Republican Party, he donated to the Barack Obama campaign in the 2008 presidential election. He has said that he was "gunning for John McCain... [but] wanted to be able to tell [his] kids that... [he] supported the first Black president of the United States."

In May 2022, Taylor announced he was leaving the Republican Party over what he claimed was its espousal of "great replacement theory" rhetoric, especially in the wake of the Buffalo shooting. He stated that “it’s become glaringly obvious that my party no longer represents conservative values but in fact poses a threat to them—and to America.” Taylor is now a member of The Forward Party.

See also 
List of former Trump administration officials who endorsed Joe Biden

Writings 
 
 Anonymous (2019), A Warning. New York: Hachette 
 "Why I'm no longer 'Anonymous'". Medium. October 28, 2020.

References 

1980s births
Living people
Alumni of New College, Oxford
American whistleblowers
Auburn University faculty
Criticism of Donald Trump
Google people
Indiana Republicans
Indiana University Bloomington alumni
Marshall Scholars
Members of Forward (United States)
Trump administration personnel
United States Department of Homeland Security officials
Year of birth missing (living people)